Gāndhārī is the modern name, coined by scholar Harold Walter Bailey (in 1946), for a Prakrit language found mainly in texts dated between the 3rd century BCE and 4th century CE in the region of Gandhāra, located in the northwestern Indian subcontinent. The language was heavily used by the former Buddhist cultures of Central Asia and has been found as far away as eastern China, in inscriptions at Luoyang and Anyang.

It appears on coins, inscriptions and texts, notably the Gandhāran Buddhist texts. It is notable among the Prakrits for having some archaic phonology, for its relative isolation and independence, for being partially within the influence of the ancient Near East and Mediterranean and for its use of the Kharoṣṭhī script, compared to Brahmic scripts used by other Prakrits.

Description
Gāndhārī is an early Middle Indo-Aryan language - a Prakrit - with unique features that distinguish it from all other known Prakrits. Phonetically, it maintained all three Old Indo-Aryan sibilants - s, ś and ṣ - as distinct sounds where they fell together as [s] in other Prakrits, a change that is considered one of the earliest Middle Indo-Aryan shifts. Gāndhārī also preserves certain Old Indo-Aryan consonant clusters, mostly those involving v and r. In addition, intervocalic Old Indo-Aryan th and dh are written early on with a special letter (noted by scholars as an underlined s, [s]), which later is used interchangeably with s, suggesting an early change to a sound, likely the voiced dental fricative ð, and a later shift to z and then a plain s.

The Middle Prakrits typically weakened th to dh, which later shifted to h. Kharoṣṭhī does not render the distinction between short and long vowels, so the details of that feature are not known.

Linguistic evidence links some groups of the Dardic languages with Gandhari. The Kohistani languages, now all being displaced from their original homelands, were once more widespread in the region and most likely descend from the ancient dialects of the region of Gandhara. The last to disappear was Tirahi, still spoken some years ago in a few villages in the vicinity of Jalalabad in eastern Afghanistan, by descendants of migrants expelled from Tirah by the Afridi Pashtuns in the 19th century. Georg Morgenstierne claimed that Tirahi is "probably the remnant of a dialect group extending from Tirah through the Peshawar district into Swat and Dir". Nowadays, it must be entirely extinct and the region is now dominated by Iranian languages brought in by later migrants, such as Pashto. Among the modern day Indo-Aryan languages still spoken today, Torwali shows the closest linguistic affinity possible to Niya, a dialect of Gāndhārī.

Phonology
In general terms, Gāndhārī is a Middle Prakrit, a term for middle-stage Middle Indo-Aryan languages. It only begins to show the characteristics of the Late Prakrits in the 1st century of the Common Era. The Middle Prakrit phonetic features are the weakening of intervocalic consonants: degemination and voicing, such as the shift of OIA *k to g. The most rapid loss was the dentals, which started to disappear completely even before the late period as with *t > ∅ as in *pitar > piu; in contrast, retroflex consonants were never lost. There is also evidence of the loss of a distinction between aspirates and plain stops as well, which is unusual in the Indo-Aryan languages.

In Central Asian Gāndhārī, there is often confusion in writing nasals with homorganic stops; it is unclear if this might represent assimilation of the stop or the appearance of prenasalized consonants to the phonetic inventory.

Grammar
Gāndhārī grammar is difficult to analyse; endings were eroded not only by the loss of final consonants and cluster simplification of all Prakrits but also by the apparent weakening of final vowels "'to the point that they were no longer differentiated'". Nonetheless, there was still at least a rudimentary system of grammatical case. Verbal forms are highly restricted in usage due to the primary usage of longer texts to translations of religious documents and the narrative nature of the sutras but seem to parallel changes in other Prakrits.

Lexicon
The lexicon of Gāndhārī is also limited by its textual usage; it is still possible to determine unusual forms, such as Gāndhārī forms that show commonalities with forms in modern Indo-Aryan languages of the area, notably some groups of the Dardic languages. An example is the word for sister, which is a descendant of Old Indo-Aryan svasṛ- as in the Dardic languages, whereas all the Indo-Aryan languages have replaced that term with reflexes of bhaginī.

Rediscovery and history
Initial identification of a distinct language occurred through study of one of the Buddhist āgamas, the Dīrghāgama, which had been translated into Chinese by Buddhayaśas and Zhu Fonian.

Since this time, a consensus has grown in scholarship which sees the first wave of Buddhist missionary work as associated with Gāndhārī and the Kharoṣṭhī script, and tentatively with the Dharmaguptaka sect.

Available evidence also indicates that the first Buddhist missions to Khotan were carried out by the Dharmaguptaka sect, and used a Kharoṣṭhī-written Gāndhārī.

However, there is evidence that other sects and traditions of Buddhism also used Gāndhārī, and evidence that the Dharmaguptaka sect also used Sanskrit at times.

Starting in the first century of the common era, there was a large trend toward a type of Gāndhārī which was heavily Sanskritized.

Buddhist manuscripts in Gāndhāri
Until 1994, the only Gāndhāri manuscript available to the scholars was a birch bark manuscript of a Buddhist text, the Dharmapāda, discovered at Kohmāri Mazār near Hotan in Xinjiang in 1893 CE.  From 1994 on, a large number of fragmentary manuscripts of Buddhist texts, seventy-seven altogether, were discovered in eastern Afghanistan and Western Pakistan. These include:

 29 fragments of birch-bark scrolls of British Library collection consisting of parts of the Dharmapada, Anavatapta Gāthā, the Rhinoceros Sūtra, Sangitiparyaya and a collection of sutras from the Ekottara Āgama.
 129 fragments of palm leaf folios of Schøyen Collection, 27 fragments of palm-leaf folios of Hirayama collection and 18 fragments of  palm leaf folios of Hayashidera collection consisting of the Mahāyāna Mahāparinirvāṇa Sūtra and the Bhadrakalpikā Sūtra.
 24 birch-bark scrolls of Senior collection consists of mostly different sutras and the Anavatapta Gāthā.
 8 fragments of a single birch-bark scroll and 2 small fragments of another scroll of University of Washington collection consisting of probably an Abhidharma text or other scholastic commentaries.

Translations from Gāndhāri
Mahayana Buddhist Pure Land sūtras were brought from Gandhāra to China as early as 147 CE, when the Kushan monk Lokakṣema began translating the first Buddhist sutras into Chinese. The earliest of these translations show evidence of having been translated from Gāndhārī. It is also known that manuscripts in the Kharoṣṭhī script existed in China during this period.

References

Bibliography

Further reading
Gandhari.org Complete Corpus, Catalog, Bibliography and Dictionary of Gāndhārī texts

See also
Pre-Islamic scripts in Afghanistan

Indo-Aryan languages
Buddhism in Afghanistan
Buddhism in Pakistan
Prakrit languages